Afrocrocus is a genus of flowering plants in the family Iridaceae. This is a monotypic genus, containing the single species Afrocrocus unifolius. The genus name alludes to the African distribution and its resemblance to the genus Crocus.

References

Iridaceae
Monotypic Iridaceae genera
Flora of Africa